Daniel de Souza Mendes (born 1 March 1993), known simply as Daniel Mendes, is a Brazilian footballer who plays as a midfielder.

Career statistics

Club

Notes

References

1993 births
Living people
Brazilian footballers
Brazilian expatriate footballers
Association football midfielders
Austrian Regionalliga players
Brazilian expatriate sportspeople in the United States
Expatriate soccer players in the United States
Brazilian expatriate sportspeople in Austria
Expatriate footballers in Austria
SK Austria Klagenfurt players